George Gerald King (11 December 1836 – 28 April 1928) was a Canadian politician.

Born in Springfield, New Brunswick, the son of Malcolm King and Elizabeth Hickson, he was a businessman before being elected to the House of Commons of Canada in the New Brunswick riding of Queen's in the 1878 federal election. A Liberal, he was re-elected in the 1882 election. He was defeated in the 1887 election and an 1888 by-election, and was re-elected in the 1891 and 1896 elections.

In 1860, King married Esther Briggs. Their son George Herbert King served in the New Brunswick assembly and their son James Horace King served in the House of Commons.

He was appointed to the Senate of Canada in 1896, representing the senatorial division of Queen's, New Brunswick. He died in office in 1928.

Electoral record 

By-election: On Mr. Baird's resignation because his election was contested, 24 November 1887

N.B. The Canadian Directory of Parliament states that George Frederick Baird was declared duly elected by a court decision.

References

External links
 

1836 births
1928 deaths
Canadian senators from New Brunswick
Liberal Party of Canada MPs
Members of the House of Commons of Canada from New Brunswick